Cartwright-L'Anse au Clair is a provincial electoral district for the House of Assembly of Newfoundland and Labrador, Canada. As of 2011, there are 3,131 eligible voters living within the district.

The district covers remote communities in Southern Labrador that are mostly dependent on fishery. The district includes: Black Tickle, Charlottetown, Capstan Island, Cartwright, Domino, Forteau, L'Anse Amour, L'Anse au Clair, L'Anse au Loup, Lodge Bay, Mary's Harbour, Norman Bay, Paradise River, Pinsent's Arm, Pinware, Port Hope Simpson, Red Bay, St. Lewis, West St. Modeste and William's Harbour.

The district is considered one of the safest Liberal seats in the province; on only one occasion in 32 years have voters not elected a Liberal, and even then – in 1996 – it was with a Liberal running as an Independent; Yvonne Jones was a mainstay of the Liberal caucus after that, and served as Liberal party leader from 2007 to 2011. She resigned to take up a seat in the House of Commons in 2013. Lisa Dempster was elected as her replacement, and has represented the seat since then.

Members of the House of Assembly

Election results

Cartwright-L'Anse au Clair

|-

|-

|-
 
|NDP
|Bill Cooper
|align="right"|44
|align="right"|2.06
|align="right"|

|}

Source: 

|-

|-

|}

|-

|-

|-

|}

|-

|-

|}

|-
 
|Independent
|Yvonne Jones
|align="right"|1,665
|align="right"|56.83
|align="right"|
|-

|-

|}

Eagle River

|-

|-

|-
 
|NDP
|Jessie Bird
|align="right"|293
|align="right"|12.43
|align="right"|
|}

|-

|-

|}

|-

|-

|-
 
|NDP
|Claude Rumbolt
|align="right"|573
|align="right"|22.70
|align="right"|
|}

|-

|-
 
|NDP
|Claude Rumbolt
|align="right"|568
|align="right"|23.56
|align="right"|
|-

|-
|}

|-

|-

|-
 
|NDP
|Elsie McDonald
|align="right"|77
|align="right"|4.54
|align="right"|
|}

|-

|-

|}

Labrador South

|-

|-

|-

|}

|-

|-

|}

|-

|-

|-

|}

|-

|-

|}

|-

|}

|-

|}

|-

|-

|}

|-

|}

References

External links 
Website of the Newfoundland and Labrador House of Assembly
 Newfoundland & Labrador Votes 2007
 Newfoundland & Labrador Votes 2003

Newfoundland and Labrador provincial electoral districts